Dr. Thomas Walker State Historic Site is a park located six miles southeast of Barbourville in Knox County in the U.S. state of Kentucky. The land was donated by the American Legion and the people of Barbourville, and marks the area where Kentucky pioneer Thomas Walker, a physician, built his cabin in 1750. A representative cabin marks the spot of "the first house in Kentucky". The site was dedicated in 1931. A replica of the cabin can be toured.

References

External links
Dr. Thomas Walker State Historic Site Kentucky Department of Parks

Kentucky State Historic Sites
Protected areas established in 1931
Protected areas of Knox County, Kentucky
1931 establishments in Kentucky